Alexander Brazeau was a member of the Wisconsin State Assembly.

Biography
Brazeau was born on December 24, 1856, in Oconto, Wisconsin. He would attend Lawrence University. Eventually, he became a lawyer and newspaper publisher.

Political career
Brazeau was a member of the Assembly in 1883. Additionally, he was City Attorney and an alderman of Oconto. In 1879, he was an unsuccessful candidate for District Attorney of Oconto County, Wisconsin. He was a Democrat.

References

People from Oconto, Wisconsin
Wisconsin city council members
Wisconsin city attorneys
Editors of Wisconsin newspapers
19th-century American newspaper publishers (people)
Lawrence University alumni
1856 births
Year of death missing
19th-century American lawyers
19th-century American politicians
Democratic Party members of the Wisconsin State Assembly